Albert Webster can refer to:

 Albert Webster (athlete) (1925-2010), British Olympic athlete
 Albert Webster (rugby league) (1920-2014), Australian rugby player
 Albert Falvey Webster (1848-1876), American author